Martina "Tini" Stoessel (born 21 March 1997) is an Argentine singer, songwriter, actress, dancer and model. She began her career by appearing on the Argentine children's television series Patito Feo (2007). As a teenager, she rose to prominence for her lead role as Violetta Castillo in the Disney Channel Latin America original telenovela, Violetta (2012–2015), and reprised the character in the series' sequel film Tini: The Movie (2016).

After signing with Hollywood Records, Stoessel released her self-titled debut studio album, Tini (Martina Stoessel) (2016). The album sold over 100,000 copies worldwide in less than two months, and reached No. 1 in Argentina, as well as the top 10 in various European countries. Stoessel's sophomore studio album, Quiero Volver (2018) with the sound of Latin pop, also topped the Argentine album chart, becoming her second No. 1 album in the country. The album's lead single, which is AR certified platinum, "Te Quiero Más", and single "Por Que Te Vas", were Stoessel's first songs that charted in the top 20 on the AR Billboard Hot 100. The album also spawned her single collaborations "Princesa" with Karol G, with whom she broke through Billboard's US Latin Airplay and US Latin Pop charts.

Stoessel maintained Latin pop sound, where she also experimented new sounds like reggaeton, cumbia and trap on her third studio album, Tini Tini Tini (2020), which received double diamond certification by CAPIF, for selling more than 500,000 digital copies in Argentina. Tini Tini Tini album, spawned her singles AR double platinum "Fresa", AR platinum "Oye" and AR gold "Ella Dice", that were Stoessel's first singles to debut at top 5 in AR Billboard Hot 100. The singles made her break the record for most top 5 debuts on the AR Hot 100 chart. Stoessel's fourth album Cupido (2023) was preceded by the lead single "Miénteme", with whom she score her first No. 1 on Billboard AR Hot 100. It was followed by "Bar" and "La Triple T". The singles also reached on the Billboard Global 200 and Global Excl. US, making Stoessel's first appearance on Global 200, and making her the first female Argentine artist to achieve such success.

Stoessel's accolades include three Gardel Award, seven Quiero Awards, one Argentina Kids' Choice Award, one Colombia Kids' Choice Award, three Bravo Otto Awards, two Martín Fierro Awards, one Los 40 Music Award, three MTV Millennial Awards, two MTV Europe Music Award and nominations for the Heat Latin Music Awards, Nickelodeon Kid's Choice Awards, Latin American Music Awards, Urban Music Awards among others. In 2016, she has been included on The Hollywood Reporter's list of 25 Most Powerful Women in Global Television. From 2017 to 2021, Stoessel was named Billboard's Argentina "Artist of The Year" and No. 1 Argentine artist on Spotify consecutively. She became the only artist that ever completely sold-out nine Estadio Luna Park and six Hipódromo de Palermo shows in a row. In 2021, Stoessel was named on ¡Hola!'s list of Top 100 Latina Powerhouse, while from 2019-2022, she was also named one of the 10 most influential women from Argentina.

Life and career

1997–2011: Early life and career beginnings 
Stoessel was born in Buenos Aires, the daughter of Mariana Muzlera and television director and producer Alejandro Stoessel. She has a brother, Francisco, who is one year older than her. Stoessel began her artistic training at a young age studying singing, piano, musical comedy, musical theater, and dance in her native Buenos Aires. Stoessel was educated at two private bilingual schools: Colegio San Marcos and Colegio Martín y Omar de San Isidro.

In 2007, Stoessel had a role in the first season of the popular Argentine children's telenovela, Patito Feo, as "Martina", one of Fito Bernardi's assistants. She also played the role of "Anna" in a flashback episode in the same series.

In 2011, Stoessel recorded the Spanish version of the Shannon Saunders' song, "The Glow", called "Tu Resplandor"; the song was included on the album, Disney Princess: Fairy Tale Songs. She performed the song at an event for Disney Channel Latin America called Celebratón on 31 December 2011. The song was later released on an album for the series in March 2012.

2012–2014: Breakthrough with Violetta 

Stoessel's father presented an unrelated project to Disney Channel producers, who later informed him about auditions for the lead role for the network's upcoming television series, Violetta. In late 2011, after an intense casting process, Stoessel obtained the principal role in the series, a tween-oriented musical series developed as a co-production between Disney Channel Latin America, Europe, Middle East and Africa. The show's first season began production in Buenos Aires in 2012. Stoessel played the titular character, Violetta Castillo, during all three seasons of the show. She sang the series' theme song, "En Mi Mundo", which was later released as a single on 5 April 2012 to promote the show. The song appeared on the first Violetta soundtrack album, which was released in June 2012. Subsequently, she recorded the Italian version, "Nel Mio Mondo" and the English version, "In My Own World". For the role, Stoessel won an award for "Female Newcomer" in the 2012 edition of the Kids' Choice Awards Argentina and was also nominated for the U.S. version, the Nickelodeon Kids' Choice Awards, in the category "Favorite Latin Artist".

In 2013, Stoessel and the cast of Violetta embarked on their first concert tour, Violetta en Vivo, of Latin America and Europe, in support of the series and its albums. She appeared on the third Violetta soundtrack album, Hoy somos más, released in June 2013. On 10 August 2013, Stoessel performed, along with the cast of Violetta, at the UNICEF television charity event Un sol para los chicos, where she sang the songs, "Ser Mejor" and "En Mi Mundo". In 2013, she recorded "Libre Soy" and "All'Alba Sorgerò", the Latin American Spanish and Italian versions of the pop version of "Let It Go", the closing credits song from the Disney animated film Frozen. These versions of the song were used in the film's ending credits in US. In November 2013, Stoessel was included in the fourth Violetta soundtrack, Violetta en Vivo. It features songs from the first two seasons of Violetta, and songs from the Violetta en Vivo tour.

Stoessel also participated in the television programs The U-Mix Show and Disney Planet for Disney Channel Latin America. In 2014, she voiced a brief role for the Italian dubbed version of the Disney animated film Monsters University. In May 2014, Stoessel released her first book, a co-authored biography called "Simplemente Tini", about her upbringing and eventual rise to international popularity. That same month, she held a free musical concert near the Monument to the Carta Magna and Four Regions of Argentina, organized by the city government of Buenos Aires, under the slogan "Cuidemos el planeta". The fifth Violetta soundtrack, Gira mi canción was released on July 18, 2014, featuring Stoessel on several tracks. All released Violetta soundtrack albums went platinum or higher. In September 2014, Stoessel performed at a charity soccer match Partido Interreligioso por la Paz, convened by Pope Francis at the Stadio Olimpico in Rome where she sang "Nel Mio Mondo" and the cover version of John Lennon's song "Imagine".

2015–2017: Film debut and musical solo debut 

Stoessel and some of the cast members of Violetta filmed the movie, Tini: The Movie. Production began on 7 October 2015 and ended in mid-December 2015, where the movie filmed in various international locations, including Sicily, Cádiz, Spain, Madrid, and Buenos Aires. A teaser trailer featuring scenes from the movie was released in late December 2015. The film was released in various Latin American and European countries. It was to be released in Argentina on 14 July 2016, but was released earlier on 2 June 2016. The movie was filmed in between concert stops for the television series' final international tour called Violetta Live. This tour was listed at top 5 highest-grossing tours in 2015, and top 5 most highest-grossing tours by Disney act ever, breaking the record of her last tour, Violetta en Vivo. On 21 August 2015, it was announced that Stoessel had signed a recording deal with Hollywood Records to release her own solo material under the newly adopted stage name "Tini", (stylised in all caps).

From January 2016 to early March 2016 she recorded her debut album in Los Angeles, California. Her debut album, Tini (Martina Stoessel), was released worldwide on digital and physical formats on 29 April 2016. The album contains two discs: one which serves as the soundtrack from Tini: The Movie and Stoessel's solo album of Spanish and English language songs. Stoessel announced that "Siempre Brillarás" would be the lead single used to promote the release of Tini: The Movie. The song was available to fans on 25 March 2016 with the pre-order purchase of her debut album. The song was also recorded in English and was released under the title, "Born to Shine". The music video for "Siempre Brillarás", featuring scenes from Tini: The Movie, was released on 25 March 2016. The music video for the soundtrack's second promotional single, "Losing the Love", was released on 6 May 2016, and its music video included clips from the film. Stoessel performed songs from her debut album at her first showcase as a solo artist at La Usina del Arte in Buenos Aires on 12 June 2016. The showcase was filmed and broadcast on her official YouTube channel from 22 to 28 August 2016. On 24 June 2016, Stoessel released her second solo single, "Great Escape", along with the Spanish-language version of the song, "Yo Me Escaparé". The music video for "Great Escape" was filmed in Buenos Aires and later released on 8 July 2016. On 14 October 2016, Stoessel released the deluxe edition of her debut album, which includes "Yo Me Escaparé" and the Spanish-language version of the song "Got Me Started", "Ya No Hay Nadie Que Nos Pare", with vocals from Colombian singer Sebastián Yatra. Stoessel released "Got Me Started", along with "Ya No Hay Nadie Que Nos Pare", as her third solo single to coincide with the release of the deluxe edition of her album. The music video for "Got Me Started" was released on 8 December 2016, while the video for "Ya No Hay Nadie Que Nos Pare" was released on 19 January 2017. Stoessel's fourth solo single, "Si Tu Te Vas", was released on 4 May 2017, alongside the music video for the song. On 18 March 2017, Stoessel began her first solo concert tour, Got Me Started Tour, starting from Europe and then heading on to Latin America. The tour was listed as the highest-grossing tour of 2017 in Argentina, and on Pollstar's "2017 Mid-Top 100 Worldwide Tours" list. In the summer of 2017, Stoessel guest starred as herself in two episodes of the second season of Disney Channel Latin America telenovela series, Soy Luna. In June, Stoessel was featured on "Todo Es Posible", a collaboration with Spanish singer David Bisbal for the Tad Jones: The Hero Returns movie soundtrack. In July, Stoessel was featured on "It's a Lie", the song from The Vamps's third studio album Night & Day, and she also appeared alongside fellow artist and the Voz Por La Paz foundation patron Odino Faccia on the world peace anthem, "Somos El Cambio", which was written by the former President of the United States, Barack Obama, and the song was first performed at the Red Voz Por La Paz ceremony the previous year.

2018–2020: Quiero Volver and Tini Tini Tini 
The collaboration between Stoessel and Venezuelan singer Nacho titled "Te Quiero Más" was released on 13 October 2017 as the lead single from her second album. In December 2017, Stoessel made a guest appearance as herself in an episode of the telenovela Las Estrellas, and she was featured in a remix of "Lights Down Low" by MAX, titled "Latin Mix". On 6 April 2018, Stoessel released "Princesa", a duet with Karol G, as the second single from her second album. The single became Stoessel's first single to top the national chart in Argentina. Also, the single reached US Latin Airplay and US Latin Pop charts. On 22 June 2018, Stoessel released "Consejo de Amor", featuring Colombian folk-rock band Morat, as the third single from her second album. On 26 July 2018, Stoessel was featured alongside Flo Rida on a remix of Álvaro Soler's hit single "La Cintura". In August 2018, it was announced that Stoessel had joined La Voz... Argentina as a coach for the reality competition show's second season; Stoessel is the youngest judge on any incarnation of The Voice franchise. On 3 August 2018, Stoessel released "Quiero Volver", a duet with Sebastián Yatra, as the fourth single from her second album. On 24 August 2018, Stoessel was featured alongside Colombian singer Greeicy in a remix of the song "Lo malo" by Spanish singers Aitana and Ana Guerra.In September 2018, Stoessel announced her second concert tour, Quiero Volver Tour, that began on 13 December 2018 at Estadio Luna Park in Buenos Aires. Stoessel's second album titled Quiero Volver was released on 12 October 2018. On 2 November 2018, Stoessel released "Por Que Te Vas", a collaboration with Cali y El Dandee, as the fifth single from her second album. In the same month, she was featured alongside Chelcee Grimes and Jhay Cortez on "Wild", the song from Jonas Blue's debut album Blue, released as a single in February 2019. Stoessel voiced Moxy in the Spanish dubbed version of the animated musical comedy film UglyDolls, released in May 2019. 

In May 2019, it was announced that Stoessel had joined the reality talent show Pequeños Gigantes Argentina as a judge. The collaboration between Stoessel and Greeicy titled "22" was released on 3 May 2019 as the first single from Stoessel's third album. The song peaked at number eight on Argentina Hot 100 and became Stoessel's first top-ten single on the chart. On 14 June 2019, Stoessel was featured on "Sad Song", a collaboration with Swedish DJ Alesso. On 26 July 2019, Stoessel released "Suéltate El Pelo" as the second single from her third album, as well as part of promotion for Pantene. On 6 September 2019, Stoessel released "Fresa", a collaboration with Colombian singer Lalo Ebratt, as the third single from her third album. The song peaked at number three on Argentina Hot 100, becoming Stoessel's first top-five single on the chart. On 11 October 2019, Stoessel released "Oye", a duet with Sebastián Yatra, as the fourth single from her third album. The song debuted at number three on Argentina Hot 100, becoming Stoessel's second top-five single on the chart in a row. The single became the third song in the history of the chart to achieve a debut at No. 3, and made Stoessel the only female to debut two songs in the top-5 on the AR Hot chart. On 10 January 2020, Stoessel released "Recuerdo", a collaboration with Venezuelan duo Mau y Ricky, as the fifth single from her third album.

The collaboration between Stoessel and Colombian producer Ovy on the Drums titled "Ya no me llames" was released on 25 March 2020. In May 2020, Stoessel released, in collaboration with YouTube, a two-part docuseries titled Tini Quiero Volver Tour. It shows behind the scenes and concert footage from Stoessel's Quiero Volver Tour, and follows her professional life during the tour. The series debuted on 22 May 2020. Stoessel appeared alongside Dutch DJ and producer R3hab and Mexican pop rock band Reik in a song titled "Bésame (I Need You)", released on 5 June 2020. On 15 July 2020, Stoessel appeared alongside fellow trap artist Khea on "Ella Dice", the sixth single from her third album. The song peaked at number four on Argentina Hot 100, becoming Stoessel's third top-five single on the chart. On 3 September 2020, Stoessel appeared alongside Lola Índigo on the remix of María Becerra's song titled "High". The remix peaked at number two on Argentina Hot 100, becoming Stoessel's fourth top-five single on the chart.

On 24 September 2020, Stoessel released "Duele", featuring trap artist John C, as the seventh single from her third album. The song peaked at number ten on Argentina Hot 100, becoming Stoessel's sixth top-ten single on the chart. In October 2020, Stoessel served as a key advisor on the Spanish version of The Voice for its seventh season. On 29 October 2020, Stoessel appeared alongside Alejandro Sanz on "Un Beso en Madrid", the eighth single from her third album. On 16 November 2020, Stoessel announced that her third album would be titled Tini Tini Tini and it would be released on 3 December 2020. Stoessel made history, having received a double diamond certification for the album. The album was also listed at Top 5 Most Listened To Albums Worldwide on Spotify Charts. The day of the album's release, Stoessel released "Te Olvidaré" as the ninth single. On 6 December 2020, Stoessel performed in a livestream concert titled "Tini Tini Tini Live", in collaboration with Claro, where she sang various songs from her third album. It was also reported that Stoessel would star alongside Sebastián Yatra in a Disney+ streaming television series titled It Was Always Me. On 24 December 2020, it was announced that Stoessel and Yatra have left the series pre-production, with their respective roles being taken over by Karol Sevilla and Pipe Bueno.

2021–present: Cupido
In March 2021, Stoessel revealed that she signed with Sony Music Latin. "Miénteme", a collaboration between the singer and María Becerra was released on 29 April 2021 as the lead single from Stoessel's fourth studio album. The second collaboration between both artists, following the remix of Becerra's single "High", it debuted at number 75 on the Argentina Hot 100. The song peaked at number one the following week, marking the biggest jump to the top spot in the chart's history. It became Stoessel's first number-one single in Argentina, and spent six consecutive weeks atop the chart. "Miénteme" also debuted on the Billboard Global 200 and Global Excl. US charts at number 65 and 62, making her the first Argentine artist to enter both charts. On 21 June 2021, she appeared alongside rapper Duki on the remix of musical duo MYA's song "2:50". The remix peaked at number three on Argentina Hot 100. Stoessel collaborated alongside Spanish singers Lola Índigo and Belinda on "La Niña de la Escuela", released on 2 July 2021 as the seventh single from the former's album La Niña. On 19 August 2021, she released "Maldita Foto", a collaboration with Colombian singer Manuel Turizo, as the second single from her fourth studio album. The song peaked at number 11 in Argentina and reached number 15 on the U.S. Latin Pop Airplay chart. Stoessel appeared alongside Venezuelan singer Danny Ocean on the song "Tú no me conoces", released on 1 October 2021. On 30 October 2021, she held a one-off concert at the Costanera de Posadas in Posadas, with Lola Índigo and rapper Khea as guests; it was attended by more than 100,000 people, breaking the record for the biggest audience for a concert in Argentina. It helped generate an economic movement of over 34 million Argentine pesos for the province. On 11 November 2021, Stoessel released "Bar", a collaboration with rapper L-Gante, as the third single from her fourth album.
 

"Bar" debuted at number six on the Argentina Hot 100; the song's top-ten debut on the chart led to Stoessel and L-Gante appear on the Hot Shot Debut. The song later peaked at number one on the chart and stayed there for seven consecutive weeks, becoming her second and longest-running number-one single in Argentina. Stoessel contributed to the soundtrack of the animated film Koati with a song titled "Vueltas en Tu Mente"; the Marc Anthony-produced soundtrack was released on 26 November 2021. In a digital cover story for Glamour Mexico, she revealed that her fourth studio effortfeaturing several collaborationswould experiment with a variety of musical genres. She further revealed that she had filmed a Chinese period drama film titled The Diary, directed by Jackie Chan, and that its release date got delayed due to the COVID-19 pandemic. On 9 December 2021, the singer released a song titled "Aquí Estoy" as a collaboration with Pantene; its music video featured the winners of the Aquí Estoy online challenge and coincided with her promotional livestream concert, the Aquí Estoy Show.

During the months of January and February 2022, Stoessel conducted a series of pre-tour music festival concerts in Argentina, Chile, and Bolivia, held prior to the official start of Tini Tour 2022. On 17 February 2022, she released "Fantasi", a collaboration with singer Beéle, as the fourth single from her fourth album. The song peaked at number six on Argentina Hot 100. On 5 May 2022, Stoessel released "La Triple T", the fifth single off her fourth album. The song reached number one on the Argentina Hot 100, after debuting at number 53, logging the second-biggest jump to the top spot in the chart's history. It became her third number-one single in Argentina and her first as a solo artist. On 19 May 2022, Stoessel released "Carne y Hueso" as the sixth single from her fourth album. The following day, she began the Tini Tour 2022 in Buenos Aires, Argentina, at Hipódromo de Palermo. On 28 May 2022, the fifth concert from her tour, which was held at Hipódromo Argentino, was broadcast live and released as a concert film titled TINI Tour 2022: Live from Buenos Aires (Spanish: "TINI Tour 2022: En Vivo desde Buenos Aires") on Star+ as a streaming exclusive under the platform's Star+ Music Live content label (serving as the debut presentation under the label, accompanying its launch) in Latin America, and on Disney+ in the United States. It became the first performance to be aired live by Disney for Latin America and the United States simultaneously. With this tour, Stoessel became the first female artist to ever sell out six Hipódromo de Palermo concerts, as well as the only Argentine artist to sell out a stadium since 2002. She collaborated with Christina Aguilera on the song "Suéltame", released on 30 May 2022 as the lead single from the latter's EP La Tormenta and the fourth single from the album Aguilera. The song peaked at number number nineteen on Mexico Espanol Airplay. On 6 July 2022, Stoessel released "La Loto", a collaboration with Becky G and Anitta, as the seventh single from her fourth album. The song debuted at number seven on Argentina Hot 100, making Stoessel once again appear on Hot Shot Debut, alongside Becky G and Anitta. On 16 September 2022, Stoessel released "El Último Beso", a collaboration with Tiago PZK, as the eighth single from her fourth album. The song debuted at number seven on Argentina Hot 100, making Stoessel appear on Hot Shot Debut for the third time. On 7 October 2022, Stoessel was featured on the song "Un Reel" from Ozuna's album Ozutochi. On 14 October 2022, Stoessel appeared alongside María Becerra, Greeicy and Becky G on a remix of Elena Rose's song "La Ducha".

Stoessel appeared alongside some of the cast members of Violetta in a Disney+ special celebrating the show's 10th anniversary, Solo Amor y mil Canciones, released on 8 December 2022. The singer's Tini Tour 2022 concert on 23 December held at Campo Argentino de Polo in Buenos Aires, Argentina was broadcast live and released as a concert film titled Tini Tour 2022: Farewell of the Year (Spanish: "Tini Tour 2022: La Despedida del Año") on Star+ in Latin America, and on Disney+ in the United States.

On 12 January 2023, Stoessel released "Muñecas", a collaboration with singer La Joaqui and DJ Steve Aoki, as the ninth single from her fourth album. The song debuted at number five on Argentina Hot 100, making Stoessel appear for the fourth time on Hot Shot Debutand later peaked at number three on the chart. Stoessel also revealed that her then-forthcoming studio album would release in February. On 26 January 2023, she announced her fourth studio album's title, Cupido, and its release on 16 February 2023, on the Spanish talk-show El Hormiguero. By the end of the month, Stoessel and Mexican singer Christian Nodal released "Por el Resto de Tu Vida", a collaboration between the two artists. 
Stoessel revealed the tracklist of Cupido on 1 February 2023. On 14 February 2023, she released the title track as the tenth and final single off the parent album. The song peaked at number six on Argentina Hot 100.

Artistry

Musical style 
While working on Violetta, Stoessel met with pop music and Latin music. She later transferred the pop sound to her first solo album Tini (Martina Stoessel). As Stoessel matured, her follow-up record, Quiero Volver, was described as an evolution to a new sound exploring the more serious sound of Latin music. Stoessel expanded with genres that are common to her home country such as reggaeton, cumbia, urban and trap sound, on her third studio album Tini Tini Tini, which she praised for having "a lot of variety and all kinds of sounds". In addition, Stoessel is also recognizable by her romantic ballads and said: On her third album, she also used in the poem with tango and explained:

Influences 
Even before her career was launched by Disney, and even more because of that, Stoessel was already a fan and was inspired throughout her career by Miley Cyrus, Demi Lovato and Selena Gomez, who, like her, were successful protagonists on Disney Channel and later forayed into the music industry. She was also questioned by the media if she would follow the same pathsometimes controversialas some of them, to which she stated that each one does what they like and follows their own road; she would not follow the same path as other Disney stars.

As Stoessel grew in her profession as a singer, she also found other inspirations. Her biggest influences according to Billboard are Beyoncé, Justin Bieber and Shakira. In 2019, in a cover story for the Mexican edition of Seventeen, when asked which was the biggest of them, Stoessel replied: "Beyoncé! She's awesome, I love her. I love everything she does, her music, her shows are amazing, how she dances [...] I like that you can see how she is present in the smallest details." This was already confirmed in previous years through her visual style (she worked with stylist Paula Selby Avellaneda, who had worked with Beyoncé), live performances and choreographies. Stoessel further cited Beyoncé as the person who she would like to collaborate with the most and also called the singer her "favorite artist": "She has inspired my career." Stoessel has praised Spanish musician Alejandro Sanz, with whom she collaborated on the 2020 pop ballad "Un Beso en Madrid", which she described as a "dream come true", and Puerto Rican musician Daddy Yankee, who she cited as a "teacher", stating that collaborating with him would be a "dream"; she grew up listening to both artists and stated them as her influences in Latin music.

Personal life 
Stoessel lives with her older brother and parents in San Isidro, Buenos Aires. Due to the expansion of her music career, she also often resides in Los Angeles, California, and in Miami, Florida. She speaks Spanish (her native language), Italian, and English.

Relationships 
In 2013, Stoessel started dating fellow Argentine actor Peter Lanzani. After two years of dating, they ended their relationship in April 2015. They got back together in the summer of the same year, but split again in December 2015.

In September 2016, Stoessel announced that she started dating Spanish model Pepe Barroso Silva, who was the actor in the music video for "Great Escape". In February 2018, Stoessel announced that she and Silva are no longer dating, but they got back together in May 2018. On 22 December 2018, Stoessel announced that she and Silva have split again.

On 10 June 2019, during the Martin Fierro awards ceremony, Stoessel announced that she started dating Colombian singer and frequent collaborator Sebastián Yatra. In May 2020, it was announced that Stoessel and Yatra had ended their relationship.

In August 2022, Atlético Madrid footballer Rodrigo De Paul revealed in an Instagram post that he and Stoessel are dating.

Other ventures 
In 2015, Stoessel became the face of L'Oréal Paris' Miss Manga mascara line in Latin America. In 2016, she became the face of the clothing brand Cher. In 2017, Stoessel launched her clothing line called Tini by Martina Stoessel. In 2018, she became the brand ambassador for Pantene Argentina and Latin America (it was renamed PanTini in the latter). That same year, Stoessel partnered with Ágatha Ruiz de la Prada and launched two fragrances: Rebel Love and Wow Girl. In February 2020, she became a brand ambassador for Adidas in Argentina. That same month, Stoessel was announced as the face of jewelry brand Pandora in Latin America, along with her then-boyfriend Sebastián Yatra. In 2022, Stoessel, along with Anitta and Becky G, was selected as the spokesperson for WhatsApp's "Gender Equality in Music & Beyond" campaign. Stoessel became a face of Maybelline for Latin America in 2022. In November of the same year, Stoessel launched her clothing line in a collaboration with Pull&Bear called "Tini x P&B Collection".

Activism and philanthropy 
On 10 August 2013, Stoessel performed, along with the cast of Violetta, at the UNICEF television charity event Un sol para los chicos, where she sang the songs, "Ser Mejor" and "En Mi Mundo". On 17 November 2016, Stoessel was named an honorary ambassador of the world peace by fellow human rights activist Adolfo Pérez Esquivel and Guatemalan political activist Rigoberta Menchú, at the Red voz por la paz ceremony in Buenos Aires. She is also a philanthropist and uses her fame as a platform to positively influence the lives of people around her.

In August 2018 and 2019, Stoessel participated again in Un sol para los chicos, a solidarity campaign for the benefit of UNICEF. Stoessel became a part of UNICEF's protect #GeneracionUnica for the rights of every child.

Filmography

Discography 

 Tini (Martina Stoessel) (2016)
 Quiero Volver (2018)
 Tini Tini Tini (2020)
 Cupido (2023)

Tours

Headlining
 Got Me Started Tour (2017–2018)
 Quiero Volver Tour (2018–2020)
 Tini Tour 2022 (2022–2023)

Co-headlining
 Violetta en Vivo (2013–2014)
 Violetta Live 2015 International Tour (2015)

Awards and nominations

References

External links

 
 TINI - official YouTube channel
 
 

1997 births
Living people
Association footballers' wives and girlfriends
21st-century Argentine actresses
21st-century Argentine singers
21st-century Argentine women singers
Argentine child actresses
Argentine child singers
Argentine female models
Argentine songwriters
Argentine women singer-songwriters
Argentine film actresses
Argentine television actresses
Argentine telenovela actresses
Argentine voice actresses
Argentine women artists
Argentine pop singers
Argentine reggaeton musicians
Argentine philanthropists
Expatriates in Spain
Child pop musicians
Dance-pop musicians
Spanish-language singers
English-language singers from Argentina
Latin music songwriters
Latin pop singers
Urbano musicians
Hollywood Records artists
Sony Music Latin artists
Singers from Buenos Aires
Writers from Buenos Aires
Actresses from Buenos Aires
Women in Latin music
MTV Europe Music Award winners